John Mason Kemper (September 1, 1912 – December 4, 1971) was a military historian and the 11th Headmaster of Phillips Academy Andover, serving for 23 years, from 1948 to 1971.

Kemper was born at Fort D.A. Russell in Wyoming into a military family.  He graduated high school from Western High School in Washington, D.C..(Spring 1972). John Mason Kemper (obituary),  Assembly (Association of Graduates, United States Military Academy) p. 137   In 1931, he started at the United States Military Academy, and graduated in 1935.(16 October 1948). Phillips Andover Installs Kemper, The New York Times, p. 17 (paywall) 

Kemper later returned to West Point to teach history, and obtained a master's degree in history from Columbia University in 1942.  He was serving in the historical division of the Army with the rank of lieutenant colonel when he was selected to be headmaster of Andover in 1948--the first chosen from outside the faculty ranks of the school in over 70 years.  In the Army, Kemper had led the service's World War II historical program branch; the program today is now the United States Army Center of Military History.(14 March 1945). Col. John M. Kemper Gets Legion of Merit for Historial Work, The Evening Star, p. B10Historical Program Of The U S Army 1939 To Present, United States Army Center of Military History, Retrieved 6 December 2022

In 1951, Kemper convinced the Lawrenceville School and Phillips Exeter Academy to join in what became the Advanced Placement program offering college level courses to high school students.  Kemper also sought to dispel the view that private schools like Andover were "training grounds for snobs", and worked to diversify the student body.  Kemper was featured on the cover of the October 26, 1962 issue of TIME.(26 October 1962). Education:Well Begun Is Half Done,  TIME

In October 1971, at age 59, he announced his resignation, due to illness.  He soon after died of cancer in December 1971, and is buried at the Phillips Academy Cemetery.

References

External links
 

20th-century American educators
Heads of Phillips Academy Andover
1912 births
1971 deaths
American military historians
United States Military Academy alumni
Columbia Graduate School of Arts and Sciences alumni
People from Cheyenne, Wyoming
People from Andover, Massachusetts